The Dark Horse is a 1946 American drama film directed by Will Jason and written by Charles R. Marion and Leo Solomon. The film stars Phillip Terry, Ann Savage, Allen Jenkins, Jane Darwell, Donald MacBride and Edward Gargan. The film was released on July 19, 1946, by Universal Pictures.

Plot

Cast        
Phillip Terry as George Willoughby Kelly
Ann Savage as Mary Burton
Allen Jenkins as Willis Trimble
Jane Darwell as Aunt Hattie
Donald MacBride as John Rooney
Edward Gargan as Eustace Kelly
Raymond Largay as Mr. Aldrich
Ruth Lee as Mrs. Aldrich
Henri DeSoto as Maitre d' Hotel
Si Jenks as Old Man

References

External links
 

1946 films
American drama films
1946 drama films
Universal Pictures films
Films directed by Will Jason
American black-and-white films
1940s English-language films
1940s American films